Evergreen Lake may refer to the following:

 Evergreen Lake (Illinois)
 Evergreen Lake (Hamilton County, New York)
 Evergreen Lake (Herkimer County, New York)
 Evergreen Lake (Onondaga County, New York)